Saccharolobus solfataricus is a species of thermophilic archaeon. It was transferred from the genus Sulfolobus to the new genus Saccharolobus with the description of Saccharolobus caldissimus in 2018.

It was first isolated and discovered in the Solfatara volcano  (which it was subsequently named after) in 1980 by two Germans microbiologists Karl Setter and Wolfram Zillig, in Solfatara volcano (Pisciarelli-Campania, Italy).

However, these organisms are not isolated to volcanoes but are found all over the world in places such as hot springs. The species grows best in temperatures around 80° Celsius, a pH level between 2 and 4, and enough sulfur for solfataricus to metabolize in order to gain energy. These conditions qualify it as an extremophile and it is specifically known as a thermoacidophile because of its preference to high temperatures and low pH levels and it is also in aerobic and heterotropic categories for its metabolic system. It usually has a spherical cell shape and it makes frequent lobes. Being an autotroph it receives energy from growing on sulfur or even a variety of organic compounds.

Currently, it is the most widely studied organism that is within the Thermoproteota branch. Solfataricus are researched for their methods of DNA replication, cell cycle, chromosomal integration, transcription, RNA processing, and translation. All the data points to the organism having a large percent of archaeal-specific genes, which showcases the differences between the three types of microbes: archaea, bacteria, and eukarya.

Genome 
Sulfolobus solfataricus is the most studied microorganism from a molecular, genetic and biochemical point of view for its ability to thrive in extreme environments; it is easily cultivable in laboratory; moreover, it can exchange genetic material through processes of transformation, transduction and conjugation.

The major motivation for sequencing these microorganisms is because of the thermostability of proteins that normally denature at high temperature. The  complete sequence the genome of S. solfataricus was completed in 2001.  On a single chromosome, there are 2,992,245 base pairs which encode for 2,977 proteins and copious RNAs. One-third of S. solfataricus encoded proteins have no homologs in other genomes. For the remaining encoded proteins, 40% are specific to Archaea, 12% are shared with Bacteria, and 2.3% are shared with Eukarya.; 33% of these proteins is encoded exclusively in Sulfolobus. A high number of ORFs (open reading frame) are highly similar in Thermoplasma.

Small nucleolar RNAs (snoRNAs), already present in eukaryotes, have also been identified in S.Solfataricus and S.acidolcaldarius. They are already known for the role they play in posttranscriptional modifications and removal of introns from ribosomal RNA in Eucarya.

The genome of Sulfolobus is characterised by the presence of short tandem repeats, insertion and repetitive elements, it has a wide range of diversity as it has 200 different ISs insertion sequence elements.

Thermophilic reverse gyrase 
The stabilisation of the double helix against denaturation, in the Archaea, is due to the presence of a particular specific thermophilic enzyme, reverse gyrase. It was discovered in hyperthermophilic and thermophilic Archaea and Bacteria. There are two genes in Sulfolobus that each encode a reverse gyrase. It is defined atypical Dna topoisomerases and the basic activity consists in the production of positive supercoils in a closed circular Dna. Positive supercoiling is important to prevent the formation of open complexes. Reverse gyrases are composed of two domains: the first one is the helicase like and second one is the topoisomerase I. A possible role of reverse gyrase could be the use of positive supercoiling to assemble chromatin-like structures. In 1997 scientists discovered another important feature of Sulfolobus: this microorganism contains a type-II topoisomerase, called TopoVI, whose A subunit is homologous to the meiotic recombination factor, Spo11 which plays  a predominant role initiation of meiotic recombination in all Eucarya.

S. solfataricus is composed of three topoisomerases of type I, TopA and two reverse gyrases, TopR1 and TopR2, and one topoisomerase of type II, TopoVI.

Dna binding proteins 
In the Phylum Thermoproteota there are three proteins that bind the minor groove of Dna like histones:Alba, Cren7, and Sso7d, that are modified after the translation process. These are small and have been found in several strains of Sulfolobus but not in other genome. Chromatin protein in Sulfolobus represent 1-5% of the total. They can have both structural and regulatory functions. These look like human HMG-box proteins, because of their influence on genomes, for the expression and the stability, and on epigenetic processes. In species lacking histones they can be acetylated and methylated like eukaryotic histones. Sulfolobus strains present different peculiar DNA binding proteins, such as the Sso7d protein family. They stabilize the double helix, preventing denaturation at high temperature thus promoting annealing above the melting point.

The major component of archael chromatin is represented by Sac10b family protein known as Alba (Acetylation lowers binding affinity). These proteins are small, basic and dimeric nucleic acid-binding proteins. Furthermore, it is conserved in most sequenced archeal genomes. The acetylation state of Alba, as an example, affects promoter access and transcription in vitro, whereas the methylation state of another Sulfolobus chromatin protein, Sso7D, is altered by culture temperature.

The work of Wolfram Zillig's group, representing early evidence of the eukaryotic characteristics of the transcription in Archea, has since made Sulfolobus an ideal model system for transcription studies. Recent studies in Sulfolobus, in addition to other archaeal species, mainly focus on the composition, function and regulation of the transcription machinery in these organisms and on fundamental conserved aspects of this process in both Eucarya and Archaea.

DNA transfer
Exposure of Saccharolobus solfataricus to the DNA damaging agents UV-irradiation, bleomycin or mitomycin C induces cellular aggregation.  Other physical stressors, such as changes in pH or temperature shift, do not induce aggregation, suggesting that induction of aggregation is caused specifically by DNA damage.  Ajon et al. showed that UV-induced cellular aggregation mediates chromosomal marker exchange with high frequency.  Recombination rates exceeded those of uninduced cultures by up to three orders of magnitude. Frols et al. and Ajon et al. hypothesized that the UV-inducible DNA transfer process and subsequent homologous recombinational repair represents an important mechanism to maintain chromosome integrity. This response may be a primitive form of sexual interaction, similar to the more well-studied bacterial transformation that is also associated with DNA transfer between cells leading to homologous recombinational repair of DNA damage.

Metabolism 
Sulfolobus solfataricus is known to grow chemoorganotrophically, in presence of oxygen, on a variety of organic compounds such as sugars, alcohols, amino acids and aromatic compounds like phenol.

It uses a modified Entner-Doudroff pathway for glucose oxidation and the resulting pyruvate molecules can be totally mineralized in TCA cycle.

Molecular oxygen is the only known electron acceptor at the end of the  electron transport chain.  Other than organic molecules, this Archea species can also utilize hydrogen sulfide  and elementar sulfur as electron donors and fix , possibly by means of HP/HB cycle, making it also capable of living chemoautotrophycally. Recent studies have found also the capability of growing, albeit slowly, oxidizing molecular hydrogen.

Ferredoxin
Ferredoxin is suspected to act as the major metabolic electron carrier in S. solfataricus. This contrasts with most species within the Bacteria and Eukarya, which generally rely on NADH as the main electron carrier. S. solfataricus has strong eukaryotic features coupled with many uniquely archaeal-specific abilities. The results of the findings came from the varied methods of their DNA mechanisms, cell cycles, and transitional apparatus. Overall, the study was a prime example of the differences found in Thermoproteota and "Euryarchaeota".

Ecology

Habitat
S. solfataricus is an extreme thermophile Archea, as the rest of the species of the genus Sulfolobus, it has optimal growth conditions in strong volcanic activity areas, with high temperature and very acid pH, these specific conditions are typical of volcanic area as geyser or thermal springs, in fact the most studied countries where microorganism were found are: U.S.A (Yellowstone National Park), New Zealand, Island and Italy, notoriously famous for volcanic phenomena like these. A study conducted by a team of Indonesian scientists has shown the presence of a Sulfolobus community also in the West Java, confirming that high fears, low ph and sulfur presence are necessary conditions for the growth of these microbes.

Soil acidification
S. solfataricus is able to oxidize sulfur according to metabolic strategy, one of the products of these reactions is H+ and, consequentially, it results in a slowly acidification of surrounding area. Soil acidification increase in place where there are emissions of pollutants from industrial activity, and this process reduce the number of heterotrophic bacterial involved to decomposition, which are fundamental to recycling organic matter and ultimately to fertilizing soil.

Biotechnologie: Untapping the resource Sulfolobus
Today, in many fields of application, we are interested in using Sulfolobus sulfataricus as a source of thermal stability enzymes for research and diagnostics, as well as in the food, textile and cleaning industries, and the pulp and paper industry. Furthermore, this enzyme is overloaded due to its catalytic diversity, high pH and temperature stability, increased to organic solvents and resistance to proteolysis.

At present, tetraester lipids, membrane vesicles with antimicrobial properties, trehalose components, and new β-galactooligosaccharides are coming increasingly important.

β-galactosidase 

The thermostable enzyme β-galactosidase isolated from the extreme thermophile archaebacterial Sulfolobus solfataricus, strain MT-4.

This enzyme utilized on many industrial process of lactose containing fluids by purifying and characterizing  for their physicochemical properties.

Proteases 

The industry are interested  in stable proteases as well as in many different sulfolobus proteases that have been studied.

An active aminopeptidase associated with the  chaperonin of Solfobulus solfataricus MT4 was described.

Sommaruga et al.(2014) also improved the stability and reaction yield of a well-characterized carboxypeptidase from S.solfataricus MT4 by magnetic nanoparticles immobilizing the enzyme.

Esterases/Lipases 

A new thermostable extracellular lipolytic enzyme serine arylesterase which is originally discovered for their large action in the hydrolysis of organophosphates from the thermoacidophilic archaeon Sulfolobus solfataricus P1.

Chaperonins 

In reaction to temperature shock (50.4 °C) in E.Coli cells, a tiny warm stun protein (S.so-HSP20) from S.solfataricus P2 has been effectively used to improve tolerance.

In view of the fact that chaperonin Ssocpn (920 kDa), which includes ATP, K+ and Mg2 + but has not produced any additional proteins in S.solfataricus to supply collapsed and dynamic proteins from denatured materials, it was stored on an ultrafiltration cell, while the renatured substrates were moving through the film.

Liposomes 

Because of its tetraether lipid material, the membrane of extreme thermophilic Archaea is unique in its composition. Archaea lipids are a promising source of liposomes with exceptional stability of temperature and pH and tightness against leakage of solute. Such archaeosomes are possible instruments for the delivery of medicines, vaccines, and genes.

References

Further reading 

 
 
 
 

'

External links 
Type strain of Sulfolobus solfataricus at BacDive -  the Bacterial Diversity Metadatabase

Thermoproteota
Archaea described in 1980